Sesame Street: Elmo's Musical Monsterpiece is a Sesame Street video game that was released on June 15, 2012 for the Wii and Nintendo DS systems.

The game features Elmo, Abby Cadabby, The Count, the Honkers, Zoe and Rosita and promotes various lessons around music, including instrument and sound identification, different music styles and counting.

Ozomatli provides the game's music.

References

2012 video games
Wii games
Sesame Street video games
Video games developed in the United States
Warner Bros. video games
Nintendo DS games
Children's educational video games
Multiplayer and single-player video games